The International Queer Film Festival Merlinka or Merlinka Festival is an annual LGBT-themed film festival which is annually organized in Belgrade (since 2009), Sarajevo (since 2013) and Podgorica (since 2014). The Belgrade edition is organized in the Belgrade Youth Center during the second week of December, and it lasts for five days. The Sarajevo and Podgorica editions are organized in January and February of each year, with the former being organized in the Art Cinema Kriterion, and the latter being organized in the PR Centre. The festival was founded in 2009 by the Gay Lesbian Info Centre and Belgrade Youth Center. It screens feature, documentary and short films from all over the world that deal with gay, lesbian, bisexual, transgender, transsexual, intersex and queer issues.

The festival was named after Vjeran Miladinović Merlinka, a transgender sex worker and actress who was murdered in 2003. She is best known for her role in the Teddy award winning film Marble Ass directed by Želimir Žilnik. The festival was established to promote LGBT art and culture. In 2014, the festival produced a theater play about Vjeran's life, Merlinka's confession, directed by Stevan Bodroža. Merlinka is the only active film festival to be annually organized in several countries.

Awards 
The Festival awards the Dorothy's slipper award for the best short film. Until 2012 the festival awarded prizes for the best feature and documentary film.

See also
 List of LGBT film festivals

References

External links 
 Official Website 
 Belgrade Youth Center
 Merlinka festival on IMDb

Recurring events established in 2009
Film festivals in Serbia
LGBT film festivals
LGBT events in Serbia
Tourist attractions in Belgrade
Annual events in Bosnia and Herzegovina
Festivals in Montenegro
Winter events in Bosnia and Herzegovina
Winter events in Montenegro
Film festivals in Sarajevo
LGBT festivals in Europe
LGBT in Bosnia and Herzegovina